The 1929 Michigan State Spartans football team represented Michigan State College (MSC) as an independent during the 1929 college football season. In their first year under head coach Jim Crowley, the Spartans compiled a 5–3 record and outscored their opponents 244 to 104.

Schedule

References

Michigan Agricultural
Michigan State Spartans football seasons
Michigan State Spartans football